Breaking News  is a smooth mix of musical genres, melodious interface of the African music form Highlife, with the Jamaican music forms dancehall and reggae as well as the American styling of hip hop. Samini calls this the hybrid world music presentation. Breaking News, also known as the #ThePeoplesAlbum, features top notch artiste like Busy Signal, Popcaan, both from Jamaica and Ice Prince, Tiwa Savage, Stonebwoy, Phyno, Seyi Shay and many more. Credits to the lead guitarist Owura K.

This album was predominantly produced by Brainy Beatz, with additional work from JMJ, Gafacci, Masta Garzy, Musicman TY, Magnom and JR. Three Official Single from the album were officially released, "New Style'", "Violate" ft Popcaan and "Ye Ko Paapi" respectively.

Track listing

References

2015 albums
Dancehall albums